This is a list of 161 species in Polycentropus, a genus of tube maker caddisflies in the family Polycentropodidae.

Polycentropus species

 Polycentropus acanthogaster Flint, 1981 i c g
 Polycentropus africanus Marlier, 1956 i c g
 Polycentropus alabamensis Hamilton, Harris & Lago, 1990 i c g
 Polycentropus alatus Flint, 1981 i c g
 Polycentropus albipunctus (Banks, 1930) i c g
 Polycentropus almanzor Schmid, 1952 i c g
 Polycentropus altmani Yamamoto, 1967 i c g
 Polycentropus apsyrtos Malicky, 1999 i c g
 Polycentropus aquilonius Martynov, 1926 i c g
 Polycentropus ariensis Denning & Sykora, 1966 i c g
 Polycentropus arizonensis Banks, 1905 i c g
 Polycentropus armeniacus Martynov, 1934 i c g
 Polycentropus aspinosus Schmid, 1964 i c g
 Polycentropus auricollis Kimmins, 1962 i c g
 Polycentropus auriculatus Martynov, 1926 i c g
 Polycentropus australis Ulmer, 1915 i c g
 Polycentropus aztecus Flint, 1967 i c g
 Polycentropus azulus Flint, 1981 i c g
 Polycentropus barri Ross & Yamamoto i c g
 Polycentropus bartolus Denning, 1962 i c g
 Polycentropus bellus Flint, 1981 i c g
 Polycentropus biappendiculatus Flint, 1974 i c g
 Polycentropus blicklei Ross & Yamamoto i c g
 Polycentropus bonus Flint, 1981 i c g
 Polycentropus brevicornutus  g
 Polycentropus brongus Gibbs, 1973 i c g
 Polycentropus carlsoni Morse, 1971 i c g
 Polycentropus carolinensis Banks, 1905 i c g
 Polycentropus casicus Denning in Denning & Sykora, 1966 i c g
 Polycentropus ceciliae Flint, 1991 i c g
 Polycentropus centralis Banks, 1914 i c g
 Polycentropus chelatus Ross & Yamamoto i c g
 Polycentropus chellus Denning, 1964 i c g
 Polycentropus chilensis Yamamoto, 1966 i c g
 Polycentropus cianficconiae De Pietro, 2000 i c g
 Polycentropus clarus Flint, 1981 i c g
 Polycentropus colei Ross, 1941 i c g
 Polycentropus confusus Hagen, 1861 i c g
 Polycentropus connatus Flint, 1981 i c g
 Polycentropus corniger McLachlan, 1884 i c g
 Polycentropus corsicus Mosely, 1931 i c g
 Polycentropus costaricensis Flint, 1967 i c g
 Polycentropus cressae Hamilton & Holzenthal g
 Polycentropus criollo Botosaneanu, 1980 i c g
 Polycentropus cuspidatus Flint, 1981 i c g
 Polycentropus deltoides Yamamoto, 1967 i c g
 Polycentropus denningi Smith, 1962 i c g b
 Polycentropus devetaki Krusnik & Malicky, 1992 i c g
 Polycentropus digitus Yamamoto, 1967 i c g
 Polycentropus divergens Mosely, 1930 i c g
 Polycentropus djaman Martynov, 1927 i c g
 Polycentropus domingensis Banks, 1941 i c g
 Polycentropus doronca Denning & Sykora, 1966 i c g
 Polycentropus drahamensis Malicky, 1982 i c g
 Polycentropus elarus Ross, 1944 i c g
 Polycentropus elegans Kumanski, 1979 i c g
 Polycentropus encera Denning, 1968 i c g
 Polycentropus excisus Klapalek, 1894 i c g
 Polycentropus exsertus Flint, 1981 i c g
 Polycentropus fasthi Holzenthal & Hamilton, 1988 i c g
 Polycentropus flavomaculatus (Pictet, 1834) i c g
 Polycentropus flavostictus Hagen, 1865 i c g
 Polycentropus flavus  i c
 Polycentropus floridensis Lago & Harris, 1983 i c g
 Polycentropus formosanus  g
 Polycentropus fortispinus Holzenthal & Hamilton, 1988 i c g
 Polycentropus fortunus Flint, 1981 i c g
 Polycentropus francavillensis Malicky, 1981 i c g
 Polycentropus gertschi Denning, 1950 i c g
 Polycentropus grandis Kimmins, 1962 i c g
 Polycentropus guatemalensis Flint, 1967 i c g
 Polycentropus halidus Milne, 1936 i c g
 Polycentropus hamiferus Flint, 1981 i c g
 Polycentropus harpi Moulton & Stewart, 1993 i c g
 Polycentropus hebraeus Botosaneanu & Gasith, 1971 i c g
 Polycentropus holzenthali Bueno-Soria & Hamilton, 1986 i c g
 Polycentropus ichnusa Malicky, 1974 i c g
 Polycentropus iculus Ross, 1941 i c g
 Polycentropus ierapetra Malicky, 1972 i c g
 Polycentropus inaequalis  g
 Polycentropus insularis Banks, 1938 i c g
 Polycentropus interruptus (Banks, 1914) i c
 Polycentropus intricatus Morton, 1910 i c g
 Polycentropus jamaicensis Flint, 1968 i c g
 Polycentropus jeldesi Flint, 1976 i c g
 Polycentropus jenula Denning in Denning & Sykora, 1966 i c g
 Polycentropus joergenseni Ulmer, 1909 i c g
 Polycentropus kapchajalaja Schmid, 1975 i c g
 Polycentropus kenampi (Korboot, 1964) i c g
 Polycentropus kingi McLachlan, 1881 i c g
 Polycentropus lepidius Navas, 1920 i c g
 Polycentropus lingulatus Flint, 1981 i c g
 Polycentropus longispinosus Schmid, 1958 i c g
 Polycentropus maculatus Banks, 1908 i c g b
 Polycentropus malickyi Moretti, 1981 i c g
 Polycentropus marcanoi Flint, 1976 i c g
 Polycentropus masi Navas, 1916 i c g
 Polycentropus mathisi Hamilton, 1986 i c g
 Polycentropus mayanus Flint, 1981 i c g
 Polycentropus mazdacus Schmid, 1959 i c g
 Polycentropus meridiensis Flint, 1981 i c g
 Polycentropus metirensis Malicky, 1982 i c g
 Polycentropus mexicanus (Banks, 1901) i c g
 Polycentropus milaca Etnier, 1968 i c g
 Polycentropus milikuri Malicky, 1975 i c g
 Polycentropus morettii Malicky, 1977 i c g
 Polycentropus mortoni Mosely, 1930 i c g
 Polycentropus moselyi Kimmins, 1962 i c g
 Polycentropus mounthageni Kumanski, 1979 i c g
 Polycentropus nascotius Ross, 1941 i c g
 Polycentropus nebulosus Holzenthal & Hamilton, 1988 i c g
 Polycentropus neiswanderi Ross, 1947 i c g
 Polycentropus nigriceps Banks, 1938 i c g
 Polycentropus nigrospinus Hsu & Chen, 1996 i c g
 Polycentropus obtusus (Schmid, 1955) i c g
 Polycentropus palmitus Flint, 1967 i c g
 Polycentropus pentus Ross, 1941 i c g
 Polycentropus picana Ross, 1947 i c g
 Polycentropus piceus Kimmins, 1962 i c g
 Polycentropus pilosa  g
 Polycentropus pirisinui Malicky, 1981 i c g
 Polycentropus pixi Ross, 1944 i c g
 Polycentropus plicatus Navas, 1916 i c g
 Polycentropus quadriappendiculatus Schmid, 1964 i c g
 Polycentropus quadrispinosus Schmid, 1964 i c g
 Polycentropus radaukles Malicky, 1977 i c g
 Polycentropus rickeri Yamamoto, 1966 i c g
 Polycentropus rosselinus Navas, 1924 i c g
 Polycentropus sabulosus Leonard & Leonard, 1949 i c g
 Polycentropus sarandi Angrisano, 1994 i c g
 Polycentropus sardous Moretti, 1981 i c g
 Polycentropus schmidi Novak & Botosaneanu, 1965 i c g
 Polycentropus segregatus Mey & Joost, 1982 i c g
 Polycentropus similis Kimmins, 1962 i c g
 Polycentropus sinuosus Kimmins, 1962 i c g
 Polycentropus smithae Denning, 1949 i c g
 Polycentropus spicatus Yamamoto, 1967 i c g
 Polycentropus stephani Bowles, Mathis, & Hamilton, 1993 i c g
 Polycentropus surinamensis Flint, 1974 i c g
 Polycentropus telifer McLachlan, 1884 i c g
 Polycentropus tenerifensis Malicky, 1999 i c g
 Polycentropus terrai Malicky, 1980 i c g
 Polycentropus thaxtoni Hamilton & Holzenthal, 1986 i c g
 Polycentropus timesis (Denning, 1948) i c g
 Polycentropus tuberculatus Flint, 1983 i c g
 Polycentropus turquino Botosaneanu, 1980 i c g
 Polycentropus unicus Hsu & Chen, 1996 i c g
 Polycentropus unispina Flint, 1991 i c g
 Polycentropus valdiviensis Flint, 1983 i c g
 Polycentropus vanachakuni Schmid & Denning, 1979 i c g
 Polycentropus vanderpooli Flint, 1976 i c g
 Polycentropus variatus Navas, 1917 i c g
 Polycentropus variegatus (Banks, 1900) b
 Polycentropus veracruzensis Flint, 1981 i c g
 Polycentropus vernus Hamilton, Harris & Lago, 1990 i c g
 Polycentropus volcanus Holzenthal & Hamilton, 1988 i c g
 Polycentropus weedi Blickle & Morse, 1955 i c g
 Polycentropus yuecelcaglari Sipahiler, 1999 i c g
 Polycentropus zanclus Flint, 1981 i c g
 Polycentropus zaneta Denning, 1948 i c g
 Polycentropus zurqui Holzenthal & Hamilton, 1988 i c g

Data sources: i = ITIS, c = Catalogue of Life, g = GBIF, b = Bugguide.net

References

Polycentropus
Articles created by Qbugbot